Toomas Trapido (born 15 April 1972 in Tallinn) is an Estonian Estonian biologist, researcher, educator, and politician. He was a member of the XI Riigikogu.

He is a member of the Estonian Greens party.

References

Living people
1972 births
Estonian Greens politicians
Members of the Riigikogu, 2007–2011
Estonian biologists
University of Tartu alumni
Academic staff of the University of Tartu
Academic staff of Tallinn University
Estonian educators
People from Tallinn
Politicians from Tallinn